Children of the Atom is a role-playing game supplement published by TSR in 1986 for the Marvel Super Heroes role-playing game.

Contents
Children of the Atom is a supplement for the Advanced Set describing all of Marvel Comics's mutant heroes and villains. Children of the Atom is an encyclopedia of mutant-kind, detailing their friends, enemies, homes and equipment. It includes a miniscenario, "Dreamchild."

Publication history
MA1 Children of the Atom was written by Kim Eastland and was published by TSR, Inc., in 1986 as a 96-page book with an outer folder.

Reception
Pete Tamlyn reviewed Children of the Atom for White Dwarf #84. He described the product as, in essence, "Project Wideawake re-done for MSH Advanced, though it is vastly more comprehensive. Nevertheless, as is the way with such things, it is already way out of date, Chris Claremont having sabotaged it by introducing wholesale changes in the X-Men comic whilst the book was in production. Nor is it fully comprehensive, no Power Pack, for example. There is an adventure at the end but it's not very impressive. If you look at it as an MSH Monster Manual you'll get the basic idea. X-Men fans and students of the Marvel Universe will love it, others may find it a complete waste of time, especially as original statistics have already been published for most of the characters listed."

References

Marvel Comics role-playing game supplements
Role-playing game supplements introduced in 1986